Gopalapuram may refer to:

 Gopalapuram, Chennai, Tamil Nadu
 Gopalapuram, Thanjavur, Tamil Nadu
 Gopalapuram, Warangal, Telangana
 Gopalapuram, West Godavari, Andhra Pradesh
 Gopalapuram mandal, West Godavari
 Gopalapuram (Assembly constituency), West Godavari